The Blanchard Nunataks are an east–west trending group of nunataks, about  long, marking the south end of the Gutenko Mountains in central Palmer Land. Mapped by the United States Geological Survey in 1974, the group was named by the Advisory Committee on Antarctic Names for Lloyd G. Blanchard of the Division of Polar Programs, National Science Foundation, and Assistant Editor of the Antarctic Journal of the United States.

References 

Nunataks of Palmer Land